Edward Bruce (c. 1280–1318), was the brother of King Robert I of Scotland.

Edward Bruce may also refer to:

Edward Bruce, 10th Earl of Elgin (1881–1968)
Edward Bruce, 1st Lord Kinloss (1548–1611), Scottish lawyer and judge
Edward Bruce (New Deal) (1879–1943), American art administrator during the New Deal relief efforts
Edward Brice (cricketer) (1840–1918), English cricketer who from 1875 onwards was known as Edward Bruce
Edward Bruce (archer) (1861–1919), American archer
Edward Bruce (music executive) (born 1997), British executive music producer

See also

Ed Bruce (1939–2021), American country music songwriter